Xie He (Traditional: 謝赫; Simplified: 谢赫; Pinyin: Xìe Hè; born May 14, 1984) is a Chinese professional Go player.

Xie He was born in Qingdao, China. He started learning Go at the age of 6. He turned professional at 11 in 1995, and was promoted to 7 dan in 2007.

Promotion record

Career record 
2006: 58 wins, 25 losses.
2007: 37 wins, 17 losses.
2008: 47 wins, 24 losses.
2009: 29 wins, 23 losses.
2010: 51 wins, 21 losses.

Titles and runners-up

References

1984 births
Living people
Chinese Go players
Asian Games medalists in go
Go players at the 2010 Asian Games
Sportspeople from Qingdao
Asian Games silver medalists for China
Medalists at the 2010 Asian Games